"Eviga längtan" was released in 2004 and is the fifth single from Swedish pop singer Shirley Clamp. The song is schlager-inspired and very similar to her previous hit single, "Min kärlek".

Produced by Lionheart, the single was released in Sweden on 23 June 2004 and peaked at number 24 on the Swedish Singles Chart. The single, has also two versions of Eviga längtan. The song is included at Shirley Clamp's debut album, "Den långsamma blomman", from 2004.

"Eviga längtan" was also on Svensktoppen for eight weeks from 26 September-14 November 2004 before leaving the chart. It peaked at number three on Svensktoppen.

Track listing
Eviga längtan
Evig radiomix
Evig klubbmix

Charts

References

External links

2004 singles
Shirley Clamp songs
2004 songs
Songs written by Fredrik Kempe